"Punk Rock 101" is a song by American rock band Bowling for Soup. It appeared on the 2003 edition of their 2002 album Drunk Enough to Dance. "Punk Rock 101" was released to radio on May 20, 2003. The single peaked at number 43 on the UK Singles Chart.

The song appeared on the video games NHL 2004 and Backyard Wrestling: Don't Try This at Home. It also appeared on the film Zoom.

Allusions
 The line "But Fat Mike's his hero" references Fat Mike, the bassist and vocalist for the punk rock band NOFX.
 The lyric "Like Tommy and Gina/They're living on a prayer" is an allusion to lyrics from Bon Jovi's song "Livin' on a Prayer".* Bon Jovi themselves are also mentioned in the lyric "She left him for staring at girls and not caring when she cried cause she thought Bon Jovi broke up."

Charts

Release history

References

2003 singles
Bowling for Soup songs
Jive Records singles
Songs written by Jaret Reddick
Songs written by Butch Walker
Song recordings produced by Butch Walker
Zomba Group of Companies singles